Joanne Heywood is an English television actress, probably best known for her role as Jessica Lovelock in Grace & Favour, a spin-off series of Are You Being Served?.

Career 

Born in York, Heywood was educated in York, Guildford and in Sydney, Australia. She studied Musical Theatre at the Guildford School of Acting and, after graduating, made her professional stage debut in 1985 production of the pantomime Jack and the Beanstalk at York's Theatre Royal. For the next decade, she regularly appeared in pantomime at the same venue, often in the coveted role of Principal Boy. During this period, she also performed in stage musicals, including regional productions of Annie, Gypsy and Camelot, as well as the world premieres of Scrooge: The Musical and the stage adaptation of High Society.

Heywood's television debut was in the role of Dilys on the short-lived BBC series First of the Summer Wine.  In 1991, she made appearances on the television shows The New Statesman (natural selection,se3)  and The Brittas Empire.  In addition to her role as Jessica Lovelock, Heywood played Sally Bennett in the Gerry Poulson film Stanley's Dragon.  She has also guest-starred in Knightmare, Next of Kin, two episodes of Coronation Street and A Prince Among Men.

In recent years, her television appearances have become less regular.  She has appeared in Heartbeat, Emmerdale Farm and My Hero.  Since then, Heywood has continued to perform frequently in regional and West End theatre productions, including plays, musicals and pantomimes.

Television roles

Stage roles

References

External links 
 

English television actresses
Living people
Actresses from York
English stage actresses
Alumni of the Guildford School of Acting
20th-century English actresses
21st-century English actresses
Year of birth missing (living people)